John Aggleton (born 14 June 1955 in Cardiff) is a British behavioural neuroscientist.

Education and career
Aggleton obtained his B.A. in natural sciences in 1976 at Cambridge University and his Ph.D. with his thesis entitled Anatomical and Functional Subdivisions of the Amygdala in 1980 from the University of Oxford. From 1983 he was first lecturer and then from 1992 senior lecturer in the department of psychology at the University of Durham. Since 1994, he has been professor of cognitive neuroscience at Cardiff University, where he studies the architecture of the brain and how various brain structures work together to provide different forms of memory.

Honours and community service
Aggleton was elected a Fellow of the Academy of Medical Sciences and a Fellow of the Royal Society in 2012. He was president of the European Brain and Behaviour Society from 2005-2006 and of the British Neuroscience Association from 2015–2017. He is a member of the editorial boards of Behavioral Neuroscience, Behavioural Brain Research, Neuropsychologia, and Neuroscience & Biobehavioral Reviews.

References

External links

1955 births
Living people
Scientists from Cardiff
Alumni of the University of Oxford
British neuroscientists
Academics of Cardiff University
Fellows of the Royal Society
Fellows of the Academy of Medical Sciences (United Kingdom)